Brian Wray was a veteran Canadian musician and musical arranger. He had been a member of three major Canadian bands, Natural Gas in the late 1960s, Motherlode and Truck in the early 1970s. He also worked with Lisa Hartt, Freedom North, Moe Koffman, David Johannesson and other artists. In later years he moved more towards the jazz genre.

Background
Born Brian Francis Wray, coming from Montreal, he was an organ & piano player. He was once a member of the group Five of a Kind which also had a pre-Mashmakhan Brian Edwards in their line up.  While he was a member of Natural Gas, he arranged the track "Eleanor Rigby", and arranged the band's hit "All Powerful Man".  He had played piano and handled the horn arrangements on Freedom North's self-titled album that was released in 1970. He also played keyboards in Canadian singer, Lisa Hartt's first band.

Like former Truck members, Larry Ernewein and Sandy MacKay (When the band was called Sound Spectrum), Wray's later in life preference was playing jazz.

Career

1960s to 1970s
Five of a Kind
During the 1960s, Brian Wray was in the group Five of a Kind which also had a pre-Mashmakhan Brian Edwards in their line up. 
Natural Gas
He joined George Olliver's group Natural Gas in May, 1969. In January, 1970 while Natural Gas were playing at the Laugh In on Victoria Street, Montreal, the group surprisingly played the "2001: A Space Oydessy" theme. Wrays keyboard playing was noted in an article,  "Natural Gas a natural treat" by The Gazzette with the writer saying "he plays piano and organ like a man who's being doing it for a long time" adding " adds just the right touch to the band".  While in the band he played piano, organ, flute and added his vocals to the recordings. He did the arrangements on the A side of the single, "All Powerful Man" bw "What Do You Want From My Life" which was released on Firebird FR 1806. The single got to #76 on May 9, 1970, spending seven weeks in the Canadian charts. It also at #12 on the Top 50 Canadian Content chart on the same date. Their album that featured his arrangements on four tracks (two of them co-arrangements), got into the Canadian Top 10. It also made the Top 50 in the United States.
Motherlode
By March 1971, he was a member of the fifth version of Motherlode. The line up also included Dave Berman (saxophone), Brian Dewhurst (drums), Gerry Legault (bass, vocals), Joey Roberts aka Joey Miquelon (guitar). They didn't get around to recording any material and became part of Truck with the addition of Graham Lear. 
Truck
In 1972, and now a member of Truck, he was part of the lineup which also included Jimmy Roberts, Larry Ernewein, Joey Miquelon, Mike Curtis and Graham Lear. 

He composed the A side for the group's second single, "Get It Together" bw "Can't Wait (Until Tomorrow)", released on Capitol 72687 in 1972. The B side was composed by James O. Roberts. In early March, "Get it Together" was getting spun on Ron Moore's play list at Radio Western in London, while "Can't Wait Until Tomorrow" (the B side) was getting play on Ron Foster's play list at CKLW-FM in Windsor. By mid-March, "Get It Together" was on John Oliver's play list at CHEC in Lethbridge. The following week it was in the "Breakout Markets" section and on Ted Hayward's playlist at CJCJ Woodstock. 

He also played on the album Truck which wasn't released until 1973. He co-wrote the opening track, "Rollin's On My Mind" with Graham Lear. The album entered the RPM100 Albums Chart at #100 on April 21, 1973. and at #85 was still charting on May  26th.

At some stage in 1973, he left the band and was replaced by Gord McKinnon who was from the group Heat Exchange.
Further activities
In 1975, he was part of vocalist / flautist Jesse Foster's backing group that also included drummer Jim Norman, guitarist Mike Rodden and electric bassist Keith Jones. Their set called "Life Is Colour" was performed at the Percussion Festival, held at St. Pauls Annex Theatre in Toronto on June 29th.

1980s to 1990s
He played synthesizer on Moe Koffman's 1982 album, If You Don't Know Me by Now..., released in Canada on Elektra XE1-60046. The album which was produced by Domenic Troiano got a good review with Andy Gemza of Medium II saying that Brian Wray played superbly, finding a niche within the band which enabled him to be exploratory on the keyboards without taking taking anything away from the traditional jazz feel that is the norm for a Moe Koffman album. He added piano to  Ralph Foster's Voice of Elvis album  that was released in 1994. Along with vocalists Rena Gaile and Debbie Flemming, guitarist Brian Legere, bassist Jim Morgan, saxophonist John Macmurchy, Wray was one of the session men on David Johannesson's blues/rock album, Hard Times which was released on Mighty Joe Music MJM-CD111 in 1998.

2000s
In December, 2000, his group, The Brian Wray Jazz Trio was appearing at The Rex Jazz Bar. In June 2001, they were appearing at the Montreal Bistro.
He helped with the arrangements on Canadian jazz singer, Carol McCartney's Be Cool album that was released in 2014.

Death
According to George Olliver's post on 12 March 2019 at his George Olliver R&B/Blues Facebook page, Brian Wray had died.

Discography (selective)

References

External links
 Discogs:Brian Wray
 Truck - "Get It Together" composed by Brian Wray
 Truck - "Rollin's on My Mind" arranged by Brian Wray
 Retired Canadian Youtube channel - Natural Gas entire LP, 1970, First song "All Powerful Man" Arr. Brian Wray

20th-century births
2019 deaths
Canadian flautists
Canadian jazz flautists
Canadian rock keyboardists
Canadian male pianists
20th-century Canadian pianists
21st-century Canadian pianists
Canadian jazz pianists
Canadian jazz musicians
Canadian organists
Canadian rock pianists
Canadian music arrangers
Canadian male composers
Natural Gas (musical group) members
Motherlode (band) members
Truck (Canadian band) members